William Hutchison may refer to:

 William Hutchison (New Zealand politician) (1820–1905), member of the New Zealand House of Representatives and mayor of Wellington
 William Hutchison (pastoralist) (1841–1914), horse breeder and pastoralist in the South-East of South Australia
 William Hutchison (MP for Glasgow Kelvingrove) (1870–1924), MP for Glasgow Kelvingrove, 1922–1924
 William Hutchison (MP for Romford) (1904–1975), actor and MP for Romford, 1931–1935
 William H. Hutchison (1843–1919), mill owner and political figure in Ontario
 William Ramsay Hutchison (1889–1918), Scottish rugby union player
 Willie Hutchison, American singer
 William Oliphant Hutchison (1889–1970), artist, president of the Royal Scottish Academy
 Bill Hutchison (William Henry Hutchison, 1923–1982), Australian rules footballer

See also
William Hutchinson (disambiguation)
William Hutcheson (1874–1953), unionist